The Luce Memorial Chapel is a Christian chapel on the campus of Tunghai University in Xitun District, Taichung, Taiwan. It was designed by architects I. M. Pei and Chi-kuan Chen.

Name
The chapel was named in honor of the Rev. Henry W. Luce, an American missionary in China in the late 19th century and father of publisher Henry R. Luce.

History
The project was originally planned in April 1954 but put on hold until July 1960. Construction took place from September 1962 until November 1963. Construction costs totaled 125,000 USD.

Architecture
The chapel is located on a 3-acre zone in the center of campus, and is set on an irregular hexagonal base, providing 477 m² of gross floor area, including the 245 m² nave (with 500 seats), 81 m² chancel, and 44 m² robing rooms. The church itself is a tent-like conoid structure, with four warped leaves rising to 19.2 m high, establishing itself as a central landmark on campus.

The chapel was first conceived as a multi-planar, wooden structure, but the architects soon abandoned the idea of using wood due both to the humid environment and to seismic concerns. The form of four curved surfaces built with reinforced concrete was likely influenced by the design of the Philips Pavilion, designed by renowned architect Le Corbusier for the Brussels World’s Fair (known as Expo 58) in 1958.  However, unlike the Philips Pavilion and other contemporary ruled-surface buildings of the era, Luce Chapel is not a thin-shell structure. The chapel’s planes are composed of lattice beams that gradually grow thicker as they descend. The structural concept might be influenced by that of the Yale University Art Gallery, completed in 1953 and designed by Louis Kahn, another noted architect of the time. The exterior of the Chapel is covered with yellow, glazed, diamond-shaped tiles echoing the diamond-shaped coffer beams on the building’s interior. The Chapel’s elaborate reinforced concrete formwork was created by local craftsmen.

See also
 Tunghai University
 Christianity in Taiwan

References

External links

Luce Memorial Chapel, Pei Cobb Freed & Partners Architects LLP

1963 establishments in Taiwan
I. M. Pei buildings
Chapels in Taiwan
Tunghai University
Churches completed in 1963
National monuments of Taiwan